Giachino is a surname. Notable people with the surname include:

Jean-Paul Giachino (born 1963), French biathlete
Pedro Giachino (1947–1982), Argentine Navy officer
Pietro Giachino (born 1995), Norwegian gymnast

See also
Giacchino
Gioachino